Hajiisaoba is a village in the municipality of Gardashoba in the Khachmaz District of Azerbaijan.

References

Populated places in Khachmaz District